Kishore Lulla is the chairman of Eros International plc, the first Indian Media & entertainment company listed on New York Stock Exchange. He is also executive chairman and director of Eros International PLC and executive director at Eros International.

Early life
Lulla graduated with a bachelor's degree in arts from Mumbai University. He also attended the School of Business and Law at the Government Law College, Mumbai.

Career

Eros International
Lulla is a member of Eros International since 11 April 2006. He is also the Executive Director of Eros International Media Limited since the year of 28 September 2009, the company listed in BSE as well as NSE stock exchanges. He is the director of  Eros International plc since 2005 and Executive Chairman since January 2010.
As Executive Chairman of the Eros Group Kishore, started working for Eros when he was 16. He teamed with his father and went to UK. He has expanded and popularized Bollywood films in U.K. U.S. and the Middle East and  entered newer markets like Latin America, South Korea and America under Lulla Bollywood films.

Contributions to bollywood
He is the founder of Bollywood For You (B4U), that is recognized as India's biggest global network of Hindi movies and music. He co-founded Eros International Ltd, in London in 1988. He has been  in the launch of the UK's first 24- hour Bollywood digital satellite and pay TV channel on the BSkyB platform.

Other contributions 
Kishore is a member of the British Academy of Film and Television Arts. He is also a member of the Young Presidents' Organization and also a board member of the University of California, Los Angeles Film School.

In 2010, Kishore Lulla and his family set up the Eros Foundation for the education of children and worked to bring equality for women in workplace.

Awards and recognition

Awards
 Lulla received the Entertainment Visionary Award  by the Asia Society of Southern California for promoting Indian cinema.
 Asian Business Awards 2007
 Indian Film Academy Awards 2007
 Entrepreneur of the Year at the GG2 Leadership & Diversity Awards
 Global Citizenship Award 2014 by the American Jewish Committee
 India Splendor Awards 2007

Honours and recognition
As per The Sunday Times rich list released in 2011, Kishore Lulla was among the richest Indian with a net worth of 240 million pounds and with a family fortune of 206 million pounds.
 In 2015, Kishore Lulla was a part of the Sun Valley Conference.
Lulla was honoured at the 2018 Economic Times India-UK Strategic Conclave as one of the Game Changers of India.

References

Hindi film producers
Living people
Film producers from Mumbai
1961 births